Acacia vittata, commonly known as Lake Logue wattle, is a shrub of the genus Acacia and the subgenus Plurinerves that is endemic to a small area in western Australia.

Description
Like most species of Acacia it has phyllodes rather than true leaves. It blooms in August and produces yellow flowers.

Taxonomy
The species was first formally described by the botanists Richard Sumner Cowan and Bruce Maslin in 1999 as a part of the work Acacia miscellany 17. Miscellaneous new taxa and lectotypifications in Western Australian Acacia, mostly section Plurinerves (Leguminosae: Mimosoideae) as published in the journal Nuytsia. It was reclassified in 2003 by Leslie Pedley as Racosperma vittatum, then transferred back to genus Acacia in 2006.
A. vittata belongs to the Acacia flavipila group of wattles and is thought to be closely related to Acacia verricula, the phyllodes closely resemble those of Acacia recurvata.

Distribution
It is native to an area in the Mid West regions of Western Australia where it is commonly situated along the edges of seasonal lakes growing in sandy to sandy-clay soils. It has a limited range near Eneabba especially around Lake Eneabba and is usually a part of low woodland or low open forest communities.

See also
List of Acacia species

References

vittata
Acacias of Western Australia
Taxa named by Bruce Maslin
Taxa named by Richard Sumner Cowan
Plants described in 1999